December Streets is an indie rock band formed in late 2009 in Pretoria, South Africa. December Streets consists of Tristan Coetzee (Lead Vocals, Rhythm Guitar), Nico van Loggerenberg (Lead Guitar, Keyboard), Gideon Meyer (Bass guitar, Saxophone), Waldo Boshof (Trumpet, Keyboard) and Corneil Classen (Drums).

The band released its debut EP, titled EP, on 20 January 2011, featuring radio singles such as My Name, Fire Through the Window and Dance with Somebody. December Streets broke onto the national radio charts, with My Name and Fire Through the Window, both charting on national radio, including 5FM. The following year, after several line up changes, the band's current line up met through attending the University of Pretoria and together wrote and released their debut studio album, This Is, on 2 August 2012.

History

Formation and early years
Tristan Coetzee and Gideon Meyer met through mutual friends during high school. Shortly after meeting each other, Gideon joined Tristan's first musical project, Local Authority, a young punk band. After various musical projects, Tristan & Gideon got together again with Michael Schoeman (Guitar)  Daniel Raubenheimer (Drums) and Erich Britz (Keyboard) to form what would be the beginning phases of December Streets, then called The December Streets. In 2009 after experimenting with various genres, they decided to go to studio to record a 3 track demo, which included future singles Fire Through the Window and My Name.

Due to university and work pressures, band members, Michael Schoeman, Daniel Raubenheimer and Erich Britz left the band in 2010, before the release of their debut EP. After several line-up changes Tristan and Gideon met Corneil, Waldo and Nico at the University of Pretoria through various musical programmes. The newly reformed band quickly gained a following among students in their hometown of Pretoria. After receiving nationwide success with their first single, My Name, they decided to launch their rerecorded debut EP. In 2012, December Streets recorder and released their debut album, This Is, after signing with 2 Feet Music (a division of Sheer Sound).

EP (2011)
The band's first physical release was simply entitled “EP” and was released on 20 January 2011. The 6 track EP was recorded at Antimotion Studio. 4 singles followed from the EP, with fan favourite, My Name, making it to the number 1 position on 5FM's Rock Chart, as well as a spot in the top 40 in the International Chart. Two other singles, Fire Through the Window and Who Needs Shoes reached the top 10 charts on the local Tuks FM charts. EP's were sold at shows only, and given away for free under creative commons. Fans were encouraged to copy, share and distribute the album as much as possible.

This Is (2012)
In 2012 December Streets started recording their debut album, “This Is”, after signing with 2 Feet Music (a division of Sheer Sound). The album consists of the rerecorded hit singles from the EP and brand new tracks written in 2012. It was produced and recorded at Antimotion'''s Studio in Johannesburg and was released to the public on 2 August 2012.

Untitled Second Album (2014)
The second album, still untitled, is currently being recorded and produced by Francoise De Klerk and Rudolph Willemse.

Band members
Current members
Tristan Coetzee (Vocal, Rhythm Guitar)
Waldo Boshoff (Trumpet, Keyboards)
Corneil Classen (Drums)

Former members
Daniel Raubenheimer (Drums)
Michael Schoeman (Guitar)
Erich Britz (Keyboard)
Nico van Loggerenberg (Lead Guitar, Keyboard)
Gideon Meyer (Bass guitar, Saxophone)

Achievements and Notable Shows
Achievements
December Streets' debut album, This Is, had 4 Top 40'' hits on a national radio station, 5 FM. This includes:
My Name
Fire Through the Window
Got that Feeling
Thief

Notable Shows
December Streets continue to play at shows and festivals across South Africa including:

Discography

Albums and EP

Studio albums

Singles
Who Needs Shoes(2011)
My Name(2011)
Fire Through the Window(2011)
Got that Feeling(2012)
Thief(2013)

References

External links 
Official Website
December Streets on Soundcloud
December Streets on Facebook
December Streets on Twitter

South African indie rock groups